Rae may refer to:

People
Rae (given name), including a list of people with the given name

Rae (surname), including a list of people with the surname

Nicknames for
Rachel (given name)
Rachelle
Raquel
Raven (given name)
Reema
Reena (disambiguation)
Rekha (born 1954)
Reshma (1947–2013)
Raelyn
Valkyrae

Science
RaE, the historic notation of Bismuth-210 isotope

Entertainment
Norma Rae, 1979 American film
The Rock-afire Explosion, an animatronic robot band
Rae (album), an album by American singer-songwriter Ashe

Sport
Rae (motorsport), a racing car constructor

Places
Rae Parish, municipality in Harju County, Estonia
Rae, Harju County, village in Rae Parish, Harju County, Estonia
Rae, Pärnu County, village in Vänrda Parish, Pärnu County, Estonia
Rae Craton (in geology of northern Canada)

Institutions 
Real Academia Española, Spanish language institution
Royal Aircraft Establishment, a British research establishment from 1904–1988

See also 
 Behchoko, Northwest Territories, made up of the former communities of Rae and Edzo
 Raekwon (born 1970), American rapper

 RAE (disambiguation)
 Ray (disambiguation)
 Rhea (disambiguation)